Ramal Məhəmməd oğlu Hüseynov (born 16 December 1984 in Hayrabolu, Turkey), is an Azerbaijan footballer who plays for Arhavispor.

Career
Huseynov was made a free agent when Araz-Naxçıvan folded and withdrew from the Azerbaijan Premier League on 17 November 2014.

National team statistics

References

External links
 
 

1984 births
Living people
Citizens of Azerbaijan through descent
Azerbaijani footballers
Association football midfielders
Qarabağ FK players
FC Baku players
Kocaelispor footballers
Araz-Naxçıvan PFK players
Azerbaijan Premier League players
Süper Lig players
Azerbaijan international footballers
People from Hayrabolu
Turkish footballers
Turkish people of Azerbaijani descent
Sportspeople of Azerbaijani descent